A slopper is a cheeseburger (or hamburger) served smothered in red chili or green chili or chili sauce. Sloppers generally include grilled buns and are often topped with freshly chopped onions and sometimes french fries. They are typically eaten with a fork and a knife or spoon.  The slopper is served in restaurants and taverns in the Pueblo and Colorado Springs area of Colorado.

History
One writer determined that the slopper originated in Pueblo, Colorado in the early to mid-1970s. The first restaurant to serve the slopper is undetermined. Some claim that it was first served in Coors Tavern, while others insist that it originated at Star Bar. According to a version of Gray's Coors Tavern's website, the slopper originated there in the 1950s. The same site also claims that the name slopper was derived from a comment by a customer stating that the dish looked like slop. The website attributes the creation of the slopper to brothers Johnnie and Joe Greco, who had previously owned the tavern.

Another story has it that the "slopper" was invented by the late Herb Casebeer, owner of Herb's Sports shop who was a "regular" patron of Coors tavern back in the late 1950s to early 1960s. He got tired of having a plain ole Hamburger every day and asked Joe Greco to put a plain cheeseburger in a bowl and smother it with Green Chile sauce topped with a handful of oyster crackers. Casebeer would entertain The "Chief", Harry Simmons, hall of fame basketball coach to sell him sports equipment over many a lunch & Schooner of Coors Beer back in the day. Simmons touted Casebeer's creation as a Pueblo delicacy over the years.

Sloppers were featured in a Travel Channel television show Food Wars episode "Pueblo -- The Slopper" (2010). The show interviewed persons involved in restaurants which serve sloppers, as well as Juan Espinosa, a former editor of the Pueblo Chieftain. Espinosa discussed the slopper's origin, attributing it to the Greco brothers who owned Johnnie's Coors Tavern from 1935 until 1983 when it was sold to the Gray family. Espinosa said that a customer of Johnnie' Coors Tavern named Herb Casebeer was dissatisfied with the amount of chili on his chiliburger, and to quell Herb, his burger was covered in chili (probably intended as an exaggerated and exasperated maneuver), and it became a delighted new serving suggestion.

It is worth noting that John Greco had a son named Joe, his brother Joe Greco had a son named John. The younger John Greco moved to Hawaii many years ago and opened a tavern called "Bubbas Burgers" whose menu still features the Pueblo "Slopper".

See also

 List of hamburgers

References

Hamburgers (food)
Cuisine of the Western United States